WEC 38: Varner vs. Cerrone was a mixed martial arts event held by World Extreme Cagefighting on January 25, 2009. It aired live on the Versus Network. In the main event, WEC Lightweight Champion Jamie Varner defended his title against undefeated top contender Donald Cerrone.

Background
Featured on the card was a rematch between former WEC Featherweight Champion Urijah Faber and Jens Pulver. Faber was originally lined up to face José Aldo at this event, but Aldo was replaced by Pulver. Aldo was instead moved to a bout with the debuting Fredson Paixao at this event, though Paixao was later replaced by WEC newcomer Rolando Perez due to an injury. The Faber/Aldo matchup would eventually take place at WEC 48 the following year, where Aldo defended his then-WEC Featherweight Championship in a unanimous decision victory.

Ed Ratcliff was originally slated to face WEC newcomer Anthony Njokuani at this event, but was forced from the bout with an injury and replaced by the debuting Ben Henderson.

The event drew an estimated 702,000 viewers on Versus.

Results

Bonus Awards
Fighters were awarded $7,500 bonuses.

Fight of the Night:  Jamie Varner vs.  Donald Cerrone
Knockout of the Night:  José Aldo
Submission of the Night:  Urijah Faber

Reported Payouts
The following is the reported payout to the fighters as reported to the California State Athletic Commission. It does not include sponsor money or "locker room" bonuses often given by the WEC and also do not include the WEC's traditional "fight night" bonuses.
Jamie Varner: $34,000 (includes $17,000 win bonus) def. Donald Cerrone: $9,000
Urijah Faber: $48,000 (includes $24,000 win bonus) def. Jens Pulver: $35,000
Danillo Villefort: $8,000 (includes $4,000 win bonus) def. Mike Campbell: $3,000
José Aldo: $10,000 (includes $5,000 win bonus) def. Rolando Perez: $3,000
Benson Henderson: $5,000 (includes $2,000 win bonus) def. Anthony Njokuani: $2,000
Edgar Garcia: $6,000 (includes $3,000 win bonus) def. Hiromitsu Miura: $6,000
Dominick Cruz: $8,000 (includes $4,000 win bonus) def. Ian McCall: $3,000
Scott Jorgensen: $8,000 ($includes $4,000 win bonus) def. Frank Gomez: $2,000
Jesse Lennox: $4,000 (includes $2,000 win bonus) def. Blas Avena: $7,000
Charlie Valencia: $14,000 (includes $7,000 win bonus) def. Seth Dikun: $2,000

See also
 World Extreme Cagefighting
 List of World Extreme Cagefighting champions
 List of WEC events
 2009 in WEC

External links
Official WEC website

References

World Extreme Cagefighting events
2009 in mixed martial arts
Mixed martial arts in San Diego
Sports competitions in San Diego
2009 in sports in California
Events in San Diego